The Oxford Times is a weekly newspaper, published each Thursday in Oxford, England. Originally a broadsheet, it switched to the compact format in 2008. The paper is published from a large production facility at Osney Mead, west Oxford, and is owned by Newsquest, the UK subsidiary of US-based Gannett Company.

The Oxford Times has a number of colour supplements. Oxfordshire Limited Edition is included with the first edition of each month. There is also a monthly In Business supplement.

The Oxford Times has several sister publications:
The Herald Series –  a set of weekly newspapers covering Abingdon, Wantage, Wallingford and Didcot.
Witney Gazette – a weekly newspaper covering Witney and Carterton.
Bicester Advertiser – a weekly newspaper covering Bicester.
Banbury Cake – a free weekly newspaper for the Banbury area.
Oxford Star – a free weekly newspaper which ran from 1976 to 2013;
Oxford Mail – a daily newspaper published Monday to Saturday founded in 1928.

History
The Oxford Times was founded in 1862 as a weekly broadsheet.

In 1922, T.E. Lawrence (known as Lawrence of Arabia) commissioned The Oxford Times to typeset and print an advance private edition of Seven Pillars of Wisdom. This is known as the "1922 Edition" or the "Oxford Text" of Seven Pillars.

The Oxford Times has won a number of national awards including Regional Weekly Newspaper of the Year in 2004, 2005, and 2007.

In March 2008 the paper changed to compact style. Until 24 October 2008 the paper was published each Friday.

The Oxford Times circulation fell from 26,262 in 2006 to 20,537 in January 2008.

In 2011 Editor Derek Holmes left Newsquest after his post was made redundant. Oxford Mail editor Simon O'Neill added the responsibility to his role under a new job title of Group editor.

References

External links
Website for bothThe Oxford Times and Oxford Mail
Newsquest

Newspapers published in Oxford
Newspapers published by Newsquest
Publications established in 1862
Weekly newspapers published in the United Kingdom
1862 establishments in England